"Love Is on Her Mind" is the second single released by freestyle singer Sa-Fire from her 1988 eponymous debut.

Track listing

Charts

References

1988 singles
Sa-Fire songs
1988 songs
Mercury Records singles